Mission Florentino was a Bolivarian mission organized by the government of Venezuelan President, Hugo Chávez, to coordinate the populace to vote "No" in the Venezuelan recall referendum of 2004 to keep him in office. The organizational centers of the Mission were named Comando Maisanta, as the ideological central headquarters (election brigades) for those who wished to keep Chávez as the President of Venezuela for the remainder of his presidential term.

The mission's name was inspired from a poem by Alberto Arvelo Torrealba entitled "Florentino y el Diablo (Florentino and the Devil)" in which a singer, Florentino, is tempted by the Devil to join him. Chávez claimed that reading the poem reminded him of the political situation in Venezuela at the time and encouraged his supporters to follow the example of Florentino fighting the Devil (those who were going to vote in favor of removing him from office). The name of the "Comandos" came from the Caudillo Pedro Pérez Delgado, great-grandfather of Chávez and nicknamed "Maisanta", who fought as a guerrilla fighter against Juan Vicente Gómez for control of the country during the early years of the 20th century.

In June 2004, Chávez announced that the campaign conducted by the Mission Florentino for the referendum will bear the name of "Battle of Santa Inés". The campaign will have the intention of reenacting the battle fought in 1859, in a town near the city of Barinas, in which Ezequiel Zamora lured the government army of the west into an area where he could defeat them in a counterattack . Chávez referred to Zamora's enemies during the Federal War as members of an oligarchy and, in the same way, to all of those who wished to vote against him in the Referendum.

Objectives of the Mission
The official objectives of the Mission were defined as:
 Incorporate the "base" of the party to vote
 Avoid electoral fraud
 Consolidate reached achievements
 Attract the indecisive segment of the population
 Neutralize the growth of the adversary
 Isolate the golpistas ("coup people", referring to those who supported the 2002 Venezuelan coup d'état attempt against Chávez)
 Incorporate the politically excluded

Objectives and Structure of the "National Comando Maisanta"
The "National Comando Maisanta" was conformed by members directly and solely appointed by President Chávez, for the purpose of:
Establishing the guidelines of the campaign
Organizing the Mission on all Venezuelan territory
Directing and following all activities assigned to the organization
Defining the advertising and publicity of the campaign
Guaranteeing the effective operation of technology in all "Comandos"
Identifying organizational problems
Producing guidelines

Members and positions held at the time
Chief of the "Comando": Hugo Chávez (President of Venezuela)
Logistic: Diosdado Cabello (former president for a few hours between 12 and 13 April 2002 and current Governor of Miranda State)
Organization: William Lara (former president of the Venezuelan National Assembly and member of Parliament)
Communication Strategy: Jesse Chacón (Communication and Information Minister)
Technology: Nelson Merentes (Minister for Social Economy)
Electoral Missions: Rafael Ramírez (Minister of Energy and Oil and PDVSA President)
International Liaison: Samuel Moncada (historian)
Events and Image: Mari Pili Hernández (journalist)
Ideology: Willian Izarra (founder and official ideologist of MVR)
Patrols: Tania D'amelio (member of Parliament)
Liaisons: Simón Pestana (candidate for mayor of Baruta)
Secretary: Haiman El Troudi (director of Presidential Relations)

External links
Official Page of the Mission Florentino 
Official videos explaining the purpose of the Mission

References
Government Official Page explaining the nature and organization of the Mission Florentino 

Bolivarian missions
Propaganda in Venezuela